Tiers Cross is a village, community and electoral ward containing the community in Pembrokeshire, West Wales. It includes the areas of Thornton and Dreenhill, and falls within Steynton parish.

References

External links
Tiers Cross Community Council

Pembrokeshire electoral wards
Communities in Pembrokeshire